Robin Sendlein is a former American football linebacker in the National Football League. Sendlein was drafted in the second round by the Minnesota Vikings out of the University of Texas at Austin in the 1981 NFL Draft.  His son, Lyle Sendlein, also played football for the Longhorns and followed in his father's footsteps to the NFL where he was part of the Arizona Cardinals. Robin joined the Phoenix Fire Department in January 1997, promoting to the rank of Engineer.  He recently retired out of Phoenix Fire Station 1, and now resides in Texas.

References

1958 births
Living people
American football linebackers
Miami Dolphins players
Minnesota Vikings players
Players of American football from Nevada
Sportspeople from Las Vegas
Texas Longhorns football players